Le Propre de l'homme is a 1960 film directed by Claude Lelouch.

Synopsis
Claude and Janine get to know each other through friends. They spend a day in Paris and they become a couple.

An exploration of the formation of a couple from both points of view.

Details
Director : Claude Lelouch
Music : Ian Bennets, Pete Watson, Alex Campbell
Length: 90 minutes
Release date: 8 March 1961

Starring
 Claude Lelouch : Claude
Janine Magnan : Janine
Amidou

Details 
This was the first full-length film by Claude Lelouch, and was a complete commercial disaster. All copies were later destroyed by Lelouch himself.

External links 
 DVDtoile page
 

French romantic drama films
1960 films
Films directed by Claude Lelouch
1960s French films